Joseph Balkoski (born June 13, 1954) is an American military historian and board game designer who has authored eight books on American involvement in the European Theater in World War II, including a five-volume series on the history of the 29th Infantry Division in World War II and a two-volume set on American participation in the D-Day invasion.

Life and career 
Joseph Balkoski was born in New York City on June 13, 1954, the son of Itala Balkoski and John Balkoski, a World War II veteran of the Pacific theater. He graduated from Great Neck South Senior High School in June 1971 and later from Vassar College in 1975. He received an M.A. in history from New York University in 1976.

When he moved to Maryland in 1981, by chance he met many residents who were veterans of the D-Day invasion, all members of the 29th Infantry Division, which spearheaded the assault. His first book, Beyond the Beachhead: The 29th Infantry Division in Normandy, was published in 1988 and remains in print thirty years later, was defined by Charles M. Schulz, the creator of Peanuts, as "an amazing book... If you want to know what D-Day and Normandy were like, from private to general, from rifle to tank, from beginning to end, this is the book for you." Balkoski's highly detailed series on the history of the 29th Division in World War II closed in 2015 with the publication of the fifth volume, The Last Roll Call, which recounts the end of the war in Europe and the GIs' return to civilian life. His thirty-year effort to detail the history of this celebrated outfit was praised by author Rick Atkinson, who described the series as "a magnificent achievement; the U.S. Army and the 29th Division are lucky to have an historian of Joe Balkoski's stature and skill to tell the tale of combat in Western Europe from the perspective of both the ordinary GI and his leaders." In 2004, Balkoski published Omaha Beach, which meticulously documented the June 6, 1944, American invasion of that pivotal Normandy objective. Two years later, he released Utah Beach, which told the story of the amphibious and airborne operation in Normandy' Cotentin Peninsula on D-Day. The two-volume set was critically well received: the Wall Street Journal described Balkoski as "a true maestro of original D-Day history," while USA Today categorized him as "the top living D-Day historian."

Military and academia 
Balkoski served for many years as the command historian of the Maryland National Guard, and runs the 29th Infantry Division Archives and Maryland Museum of Military History, both at the Fifth Regiment Armory in Baltimore, housing one of the finest collections in the United States of archival papers devoted to the World War II history of a single U.S. Army or Marine Corps division. In 2014, he designed the exhibit "When Freemen Shall Stand" at the Maryland Museum of Military History, which focused on the defense of Baltimore by Maryland citizen-soldiers in September 1814 against an attack by a British expeditionary force, an event that led to the writing of "The Star-Spangled Banner". In 2017, the 100th anniversary of American entry into World War I, he created the exhibit "Over There," portraying the life of Marylanders both overseas and on the home front during the Great War. He has served as an adjunct professor in both the history and writing departments at the University of Baltimore and the Community College of Baltimore County. He frequently conducts battlefield staff rides in the U.S. and Europe for U.S. Army soldiers as part of their military training. Balkoski currently serves on the National Executive Committee of the 29th Division Association, which formulates and executes policy in support of all 29th Division veterans and their families; and the Maryland Military Monuments Commission, which oversees hundreds of military monuments within the state.

Awards 
 2018: Distinguished Service Cross (Maryland)
 2013: Baltimore City Historical Society Lifetime Achievement Award, Mayor's History Reception
 2012: Secretary of the Army, Honorary Membership, 175th Infantry Regiment 
 2010: Meritorious Service Medal (Maryland)
 2008: Secretary of the Army, Honorary Membership, 116th Infantry Regiment
 2005: Meritorious Civilian Service Medal (Maryland)
 2004: U.S. Army Military History Institute, Matthew B. Ridgway Research Grant
 2004: Appointed Commissioner, Maryland Military Monuments Commission, by Governor Robert Ehrlich
 1991: Secretary of the Army, Honorary Membership, 115th Infantry Regiment 
 1989: Charles Roberts Award, Wargame Design Hall of Fame

Family 
Balkoski currently resides in Maryland.

Books by Joseph Balkoski 
 Beyond the Beachhead: The 29th Infantry Division in Normandy. Harrisburg: Stackpole, 1989.  
 The Maryland National Guard: A History of Maryland's Military Forces. Baltimore: Maryland Military Department, 1992.  
 Confederate Tide Rising -- The Antietam Campaign: Harpers Ferry, South Mountain, and Antietam Battlefield Staff Ride/Leadership Development Seminar Reference Book. Leesburg: OSS Publishing, 2001. 
 Omaha Beach. Mechanicsburg: Stackpole, 2004.  
 Utah Beach. Mechanicsburg: Stackpole, 2006.  
 Father Eugene Patrick O'Grady: A Legendary Twenty-Niner and Baltimorean. Maryland Historical Magazine, 102 no. 1, Spring 2007.
 From Beachhead to Brittany: The 29th Infantry Division at Brest. Mechanicsburg: Stackpole, 2008.  
 From Brittany to the Reich: The 29th Infantry Division in Germany. Mechanicsburg: Stackpole, 2010.  
 Our Tortured Souls: The 29th Infantry Division in the Rhineland. Mechanicsburg: Stackpole, 2013.  
 The Last Roll Call: The 29th Infantry Division Victorious. Mechanicsburg: Stackpole, 2015.

Notable board wargames by Joseph Balkoski 
 'Wacht am Rhein': The Battle of the Bulge, 16 Dec 44 – 2 Jan 45 (SPI, 1977 - with Jim Dunnigan and Redmond A. Simonsen)
 Atlantic Wall: The Invasion of Europe June 1944 (SPI, 1978)
 Operation Typhoon: The German Assault on Moscow, 1941 (SPI, 1978)
 2nd Fleet: Modern Naval Combat in the North Atlantic (Victory Games, 1986)
 The Korean War June 1950-May 1951 (Victory Games, 1986)
 Stonewall Jackson's Way (The Avalon Hill Game Co, 1992)
 Roads to Gettysburg II: Lee Strikes North (Multi-Man Publishing, 2018)
 On to Richmond! (The Avalon Hill Game Co, 1998)
 Grant Takes Command (Multi-Man Publishing, 2001)

Notes and references

External links 
29th Infantry Division Archives Facebook Page
Maryland Museum of Military History Website

1954 births
Living people
American military historians
American male non-fiction writers
New York University alumni
Vassar College alumni
William A. Shine Great Neck South High School alumni